Alex Garcia (born July 14, 1987) is a Dominican mixed martial artist who formerly competed in the Welterweight division of the Ultimate Fighting Championship.

Mixed martial arts career 
Garcia made his professional debut in the summer of 2009 against Joel Vales at AFC 1. He won the fight via submission in the first round. Garcia would win his next five fights with finishes in all of them, with all of them but one finishing in the first round. Garcia experienced his first professional defeat at the hands of UFC vet Seth Baczynski by knockout at Ringside MMA 10, the fight was for the Interim Ringside Welterweight title. After the loss Garcia went on to win four more straight fights finishing three of the four wins in the first round.

Ultimate Fighting Championship 
On October 8, 2013 it was announced that Garcia was signed with the UFC and was expected to make his debut UFC Fight Night 33 against fellow newcomer Andreas Stahl. Stahl had to pull out with an injury.  Garcia's new opponent for the event was former TUF Smashes cast member Ben Wall. Garcia won the fight via knockout at just 43 seconds into the first round.

Garcia next faced Sean Spencer on March 15, 2014 at UFC 171. He won the back-and-forth fight via split decision.

Garcia was expected to face promotional newcomer Matt Dwyer on August 2, 2014 at UFC 176.  However, Dwyer pulled out of the bout citing injury and was replaced by Neil Magny.  Subsequently, after UFC 176 was cancelled, Magny/Garcia was rescheduled and eventually took place on August 23, 2014 at UFC Fight Night 49. He lost the fight by unanimous decision.

Garcia faced Mike Swick on July 11, 2015 at UFC 189. He won the fight by unanimous decision.

Garcia faced Sean Strickland on February 21, 2016 at UFC Fight Night 83. After a back-and-forth first two rounds, he lost the fight via TKO in the third round.

Garcia was expected to face Colby Covington on June 18, 2016 at UFC Fight Night 89. However, Garcia was pulled from the fight on June 10 for undisclosed reasons and replaced by promotional newcomer Jonathan Meunier.

Garcia faced Mike Pyle on December 30, 2016 at UFC 207. He won the fight by knockout in the first round. The win also earned Garcia his first Performance of the Night bonus award.

Garcia faced Tim Means on June 25, 2017 at UFC Fight Night 112. He lost by unanimous decision.

Garcia faced Muslim Salikhov on November 25, 2017 at UFC Fight Night 122. He won the fight via submission in the second round.

Gracia faced Ryan LaFlare on April 21, 2018 at UFC Fight Night 128. He lost the fight via unanimous decision.

Garcia faced Court McGee on October 27, 2018 at UFC Fight Night 138. He lost the fight by unanimous decision.

On September 20, 2019, it was reported that Garcia was released from UFC.

Championships and accomplishments
Ultimate Fighting Championship
Performance of the Night (one time) vs. Mike Pyle

Mixed martial arts record

|-
|Loss
|align=center|15–8
|Abdul Rahman Dzhanaev
|TKO (punches)
|ACA 105: Shakhublatov vs. Oliveira
|
|align=center|2
|align=center|0:44
|Almaty, Kazakhstan 
|
|-
|Loss
|align=center|15–7
|Ibragim Chuzhigaev
|TKO (punches)
|ACA 99: Bagov vs. Khaliev
|
|align=center|1
|align=center|1:52
|Moscow, Russia
|
|-
|Loss
|align=center|15–6
|Court McGee
|Decision (unanimous)
|UFC Fight Night: Volkan vs. Smith 
|
|align=center|3
|align=center|5:00
|Moncton, New Brunswick, Canada
|
|-
|Loss
|align=center|15–5
|Ryan LaFlare
|Decision (unanimous)
|UFC Fight Night: Barboza vs. Lee
|
|align=center|3
|align=center|5:00
|Atlantic City, New Jersey, United States
|
|-
|Win
|align=center|15–4
|Muslim Salikhov
|Submission (rear-naked choke)
|UFC Fight Night: Bisping vs. Gastelum
|
|align=center|2
|align=center|3:22
|Shanghai, China
|
|-
|Loss
|align=center|14–4
|Tim Means
|Decision (unanimous)
|UFC Fight Night: Chiesa vs. Lee
|
|align=center|3
|align=center|5:00
|Oklahoma City, Oklahoma, United States
|
|-
|Win
|align=center|14–3
|Mike Pyle
|KO (punch)
|UFC 207
|
|align=center|1
|align=center|3:34
|Las Vegas, Nevada, United States
|
|-
|Loss
|align=center|13–3
|Sean Strickland
|KO (punches)
|UFC Fight Night: Cowboy vs. Cowboy
|
|align=center|3
|align=center|4:25
|Pittsburgh, Pennsylvania, United States
|
|-
|Win
|align=center|13–2
|Mike Swick
|Decision (unanimous)
|UFC 189
|
|align=center|3
|align=center|5:00
|Las Vegas, Nevada, United States
|
|-
| Loss
|align=center| 12–2
|Neil Magny
| Decision (unanimous)
|UFC Fight Night: Henderson vs. dos Anjos
|
|align=center|3
|align=center|5:00
|Tulsa, Oklahoma, United States
|
|-
| Win
|align=center| 12–1
|Sean Spencer
| Decision (split)
|UFC 171
|
|align=center|3
|align=center|5:00
|Dallas, Texas, United States
|
|-
| Win
|align=center| 11–1
|Ben Wall
| KO (punches) 
|UFC Fight Night: Hunt vs. Bigfoot
|December 7, 2013
|align=center|1
|align=center|0:43
|Brisbane, Australia
|
|-
| Win
|align=center| 10–1
|Chris Heatherly
| Submission (rear-naked choke)
|Challenge MMA 2: Think Big
|August 17, 2013
|align=center|1
|align=center|1:42
|Montreal, Quebec, Canada
|
|-
| Win
|align=center| 9–1
|Ryan Dickson
| Decision (unanimous)
|Challenge MMA 1: Sensations
|May 11, 2013
|align=center|3
|align=center|5:00
|St-Jean-sur-Richelieu, Quebec, Canada
|
|-
| Win
|align=center| 8–1
|Stephane Lamarche
| Submission (rear-naked choke)
|Slamm 1: Garcia vs. Lamarche
|November 30, 2012
|align=center|1
|align=center|1:58
|Montreal, Quebec, Canada
|
|-
| Win
|align=center| 7–1
|Matt MacGrath
| KO (punches)
|Ringside MMA 12: Daley vs. Fioravanti
|October 21, 2011
|align=center|1
|align=center|0:34
|Montreal, Quebec, Canada
|
|-
| Loss
|align=center| 6–1
|Seth Baczynski
| KO (punches)
|Ringside MMA 10: Cote vs. Starnes
|April 9, 2011
|align=center|2
|align=center|2:44
|Montreal, Quebec, Canada
|
|-
| Win
|align=center| 6–0
|Tyler Jackson
| Submission (rear-naked choke)
|Ringside MMA 9: Payback
|November 13, 2010
|align=center|1
|align=center|4:51
|Montreal, Quebec, Canada
|
|-
| Win
|align=center| 5–0
|Ricky Goodall
| Submission (rear-naked choke)
|Ringside MMA 7: No Escape
|June 18, 2010
|align=center|1
|align=center|4:05
|Montreal, Quebec, Canada
|
|-
| Win
|align=center| 4–0
|Jaret MacIntosh
| TKO (punches)
|Ringside MMA 6: Rage
|April 10, 2010
|align=center|1
|align=center|0:44
|Montreal, Quebec, Canada
|
|-
| Win
|align=center| 3–0
|Matt Northcott
| TKO (punches)
|Ringside MMA 5: Triple Threat
|January 30, 2010
|align=center|3
|align=center|3:44
|Montreal, Quebec, Canada
|
|-
| Win
|align=center| 2–0
|T.J. Coletti
| TKO (punches)
|MFL 1: The Beginning
|October 17, 2009
|align=center|1
|align=center|3:34
|Montreal, Quebec, Canada
|
|-
| Win
|align=center| 1–0
|Joel Vales
| Submission (armbar)
|AFC 1: Alianza Full Contact
|August 28, 2009
|align=center|1
|align=center|1:24
|Santo Domingo, Dominican Republic
|
|-

See also
 List of current UFC fighters
 List of male mixed martial artists

References

External links
 
 

Living people
1987 births
Dominican Republic practitioners of Brazilian jiu-jitsu
Dominican Republic male mixed martial artists
Dominican Republic emigrants to Canada
People from Santiago de los Caballeros
Welterweight mixed martial artists
Mixed martial artists utilizing kickboxing
Mixed martial artists utilizing Brazilian jiu-jitsu
Ultimate Fighting Championship male fighters